Gareth Nichols (born 17 June 1983) is an Australian bobsledder. He competed at the FIBT World Championships 2012 in Lake Placid, and the FIBT World Championships 2013 in St. Moritz. He competed at the 2014 Winter Olympics in Sochi, in four-man bobsleigh.

References 

1983 births
Living people
Bobsledders at the 2014 Winter Olympics
Australian male bobsledders
Olympic bobsledders of Australia